Drue Kataoka is a Japanese American visual artist, known for her Sumi-e art. In 2012, she was chosen Young Global Leader for the World Economic Forum summit at Davos. She is based in Silicon Valley, California.

Early life and education 
Kataoka was born in Tokyo, Japan and lived there until age 5. Her family moved to Washington D.C., then onto Seattle and later to Silicon Valley. Her father Tetsuya Kataoka is a political scientist, and research fellow at Hoover Institution, and her mother Barbara Kataoka (née Slavin) worked in the Communications department at Stanford University. She attended high school at Sacred Heart Preparatory a private school in Atherton, California and graduated high school in 1996.

Kataoka attended college at Stanford University, where she majored in Art History and graduated in 2000. She participated in Stanford Jazz Band, where she played the flute.

She began her art education in Sumi-e early in Japan and later in the US, earning her han (signature stamp) from Sensei, M. Iseke.

Art
Kataoka's art work spans various materials and practices including brainwave installations, sculptural works such as her "magic boxes" and "membranes," sumni-e brush work art, and paintings.

A major theme in Kataoka's art is building negative space. Her artistic philosophy revolves around the idea that a piece of art materializes only during the interaction of art object and viewer.  Her works intentionally leave open, unfinished elements which serve as an invitation for the viewer to fill in the blanks and begin a dialogue with the art. Kataoka's objective is to create works of art that will look different, and be rediscovered, during every interaction.

Early work
Kataoka's early works were in the canon of Sumi-e. However, early on she started experimenting with depicting modern subject matter such as sports, dance, jazz, public figures. Wynton Marsalis commissioned her to create a suite of album art for his Sony Columbia record, A Fiddler’s Tale. While at Stanford University, she completed 27 commemorative prints including the official print for the 100th anniversary of the Stanford University-California Big Game, the print for President Gerhard Casper's retirement gift, and the millennial portrait of Dr. Martin Luther King Jr. for The Martin Luther King Jr. Research and Education Institute at Stanford University.

Her commemorative prints are archived in the Department of Special Collections, Stanford University Libraries. Her painting of the Hoover carillon, I Ring for Peace is permanently installed at the Hoover Institution. She is a recipient of the 2006 Martin Luther King Jr. Research & Education Institute Award.

Current work
In January 2013, Kataoka unveiled a brainwave-smart glass installation in Davos. She also created a conceptual piece Up (2008) which incorporated Special Relativistic effects. Up was sent into space for the first Zero Gravity Art Exhibit at the International Space Station. She has developed techniques such as Magic Boxes and Shattered Mirrors to merge the art, its surroundings and the viewer in an artistic continuum.

A conceptual piece she created for HRH Princess Takamado of Japan involved paintings on ping pong paddles which were designed to create associations with the Japanese flag.

Kataoka has written political commentary for CNBC in 2016.

References

External links
 Official site
 Kataoka's exhibit at The World Economic Forum Annual Meeting, 2012

American women artists
American artists of Japanese descent
Living people
People from Tokyo
Japanese emigrants to the United States
Stanford University alumni
Year of birth missing (living people)
Artists from California
21st-century American women